
Year 245 BC was a year of the pre-Julian Roman calendar. At the time it was known as the Year of the Consulship of Buteo and Bulbus (or, less frequently, year 509 Ab urbe condita). The denomination 245 BC for this year has been used since the early medieval period, when the Anno Domini calendar era became the prevalent method in Europe for naming years.

Events 
 By place 
 Egypt 
 Babylon and Susa fall to the Egyptian armies of Ptolemy III.
 Following a long engagement, Ptolemy III marries Berenice II, the daughter of Magas, king of Cyrene; thereby reuniting Egypt and Cyrenaica.

 Greece 
 After the death of his nephew, Alexander of Corinth, Antigonus II gives Nicaea, Alexander's widow, to his son Demetrius in marriage. Through this action, Antigonus II regains Corinth which has been independent while under the rule of Alexander of Corinth.
 Aratus of Sicyon is elected general (strategos) of the Achaean League.

 China 
 The Qin general Pao Gong captures the Wei city of Juan.
 The Zhao general Lian Po captures the Wei city of Fanyang.

Births 
 Hasdrubal Barca, Carthaginian general and Younger brother of Hannibal (d. 207 BC)

Deaths 
 Apollonius of Rhodes, Greek poet, grammarian, and author of the Argonautica, an epic in four books on the voyage of the Argonauts (b. c. 295 BC)

References